John Kenneth "J. K." McKay (born March 28, 1953) is a former American football player, trial attorney, and executive with positions at the Alliance of American Football and the University of Southern California. As a professional athlete, McKay played wide receiver for the Tampa Bay Buccaneers of the National Football League (NFL) from 1976 to 1978.

College career
McKay played college football at USC, where he played on the 1972 and 1974 National Championship teams and caught, among many others, a 38-yard touchdown pass from long time best friend, quarterback Pat Haden in the fourth quarter of the 1975 Rose Bowl game. He was named co-MVP of the game along with Haden.

McKay was inducted into the Rose Bowl Hall of Fame in 1998.

Professional career
He was drafted by the Cleveland Browns in the 16th round of the 1975 NFL Draft, but opted instead to play for the Southern California Sun of the World Football League due to a dislike for the Cleveland area. After the WFL ceased operations midway through its 1975 season, the Browns made him available in the 1976 NFL expansion draft, where he was selected by the expansion Tampa Bay Buccaneers. In Tampa Bay, McKay started at receiver for three controversial seasons. Quarterback Steve Spurrier's belief that McKay was playing ahead of better receivers because he was the son of head coach John McKay, led him to throw passes over the vulnerable middle of the field in an attempt to get McKay injured. McKay was considered a reliable pass-catcher whom opposing defenses considered as a legitimate threat. He was forced to retire due to complications from a broken hand.

Post-playing career
After retiring from professional football, McKay attended the Stetson University College of Law, and became a trial attorney in the Tampa area. In 1986, he moved to Los Angeles and continued practicing law as a partner with the law firm of Allen, Matkins, Leck, Gamble & Mallory. In 2001, he took a position as General Manager of the Los Angeles Xtreme in the XFL. The Xtreme were the first and only champions of the XFL.

In 2010, McKay became Senior Associate Athletic Director of the University of Southern California, under the direction of his friend and former teammate Pat Haden.

In 2018, he was announced as the Head of Football Operations of the Alliance of American Football.

Personal life
McKay is a son of former USC Trojan and Tampa Bay Buccaneers coach John McKay and the older brother of former Buccaneers general manager and Atlanta Falcons president, Rich McKay.

McKay is married and has three children.

He is often referred to as "J. K." in the press, but is more commonly known as "John" or "Johnny".

References

1953 births
Living people
American football wide receivers
USC Trojans football players
Cleveland Browns players
Southern California Sun players
Tampa Bay Buccaneers players
Sportspeople from Eugene, Oregon
Stetson University College of Law alumni
Alliance of American Football executives